The 1985–86 Brown Bears men's basketball team represented Brown University during the 1985–86 NCAA Division I men's basketball season. The Bears, led by head coach Mike Cingiser, played their home games at the Marvel Gymnasium and were members of the Ivy League. They finished the season 16–11, 10–4 in Ivy League play to win the league championship and an automatic bid to the NCAA tournament. As No. 15 seed in the East region, the Bears were defeated by No. 2 seed Syracuse, 101–52, in the opening round. To date, this is Brown University's only Ivy League championship and most recent appearance in the NCAA Tournament.

Roster

Schedule and results

|-
!colspan=9 style=| Non-conference regular season

|-
!colspan=9 style=| Ivy League regular season

|-
!colspan=9 style=| NCAA Tournament

Awards and honors
Jim Turner – Ivy League Player of the Year

References

Brown Bears men's basketball seasons
Brown
Brown
Brown
Brown